Glody Dube (born 2 July 1978 in Matshelagabedi) is a retired Botswana middle distance runner who specialized in the 800 metres.

Achievements

Personal bests
800 metres - 1:44.59 min (2001)
1500 metres - 3:39.60 min (2001) – national record

External links
 

1978 births
Living people
People from North-East District (Botswana)
Botswana male middle-distance runners
Athletes (track and field) at the 1998 Commonwealth Games
Athletes (track and field) at the 2000 Summer Olympics
Athletes (track and field) at the 2002 Commonwealth Games
Athletes (track and field) at the 2004 Summer Olympics
Olympic athletes of Botswana
Commonwealth Games competitors for Botswana
Athletes (track and field) at the 1999 All-Africa Games
Athletes (track and field) at the 2007 All-Africa Games
African Games competitors for Botswana